Delaware may refer to:

Title of Thomas West, 3rd Baron De La Warr, after whom the following were named:
Delaware, the U.S. state
Delaware Colony, English colony (1664–1707) then British colony (1707–76) preceding statehood
Lenape, the Native American tribe also known as the Delaware
Delaware Nation, a Native American tribe in Oklahoma
Lenape language, the Algonquian language of the Lenape tribe
Delaware River, a major river in the eastern United States
Delaware Bay, tidal inlet which separates New Jersey from the state of Delaware; fed by the Delaware River
Delaware Lake, a lake in Delaware County, New York

Places

United States

Delaware City, Delaware
University of Delaware
Delaware, Indiana
Delaware, Iowa
Delaware River (Kansas)
Delaware, Michigan
Delaware, Missouri
Delaware, New York
Delaware, Ohio
Delaware, Oklahoma
Delaware Water Gap, Pennsylvania
Delaware Falls, one of 24 named waterfalls in Ricketts Glen State Park in Pennsylvania
 Delaware Basin in the U.S. state of New Mexico

Canada
Delaware, Ontario

Ships
 , the name of various United States Navy ships
 NOAAS Delaware II (R 445), a United States National Oceanic and Atmospheric Administration fisheries research ship in service since 1968
 Delaware (fireboat), in service in Philadelphia (1950-), see Fireboats of Philadelphia

Other
"Delaware" (song) a popular song from 1959 with puns on the names of the American states
Delaware (band)
Delaware (album) first album by Drop Nineteens
Delaware (chicken), breed of chicken from the state
Blue Hen of Delaware, other breed of chicken from the state
Delaware General Corporation Law
Delaware (grape)
Delaware St. John, an adventure game series
Delaware Basin, a geologic depositional and structural basin in West Texas and southern New Mexico

See also
 Delaware County (disambiguation)
 Delaware Township (disambiguation)